Regulator of nonsense transcripts 2 is a protein that in humans is encoded by the UPF2 gene.

Function 

This gene encodes a protein that is part of a post-splicing multiprotein complex, the exon junction complex, involved in both mRNA nuclear export and mRNA surveillance. mRNA surveillance detects exported mRNAs with truncated open reading frames and initiates nonsense-mediated mRNA decay (NMD). When translation ends upstream from the last exon-exon junction, this triggers NMD to degrade mRNAs containing premature stop codons. This protein is located in the perinuclear area. It interacts with translation release factors and the proteins that are functional homologs of yeast Upf1p and Upf3p. Two splice variants have been found for this gene; both variants encode the same protein. UPF2 has recently been shown to alter adult behavior via alterations in hippocampal synaptic spine density and the late long-term potentiation of neurons.

Interactions 

UPF2 has been shown to interact with UPF1, UPF3A and UPF3B.

References

Further reading